Liolaemus nigromaculatus is a species of tree iguana endemic to the Chilean matorral ecoregion within Chile. The species was first described in 1834, by Arend Friedrich August Wiegmann and was later redescribed in 2013 by Chilean biologists.

References

External links
 Liolaemus nigromaculatus at the Animal Diversity Web

nigromaculatus
Lizards of South America
Endemic fauna of Chile
Reptiles of Chile
Chilean Matorral
Reptiles described in 1834
Taxa named by Arend Friedrich August Wiegmann